Elections to Local bodies in Andhra Pradesh were held in four phases in rural areas (panchayats) in February 2021 viz. 9 February 2021, 13 February 2021, 17 February 2021 and 21 February 2021 covering 13 districts. In the first phase, 29,732 polling stations were set up.

Background

Gram Panchayat elections

Election schedule

Phase 1

Phase 2

Phase 3

Phase 4

Elections held

Phase 1

Phase 2 
In the second phase, 539 sarpanch seats have been unanimously won, So, there is no election in those grama panchayatis. The elections were held in 18 revenue divisions and 167 mandals.

Election results

District-wise

Anantapuramu

Chittoor

East Godavari

Guntur

Kadapa

Krishna

Kurnool

Nellore

Prakasam

Srikakulam

Visakhapatnam

Vizianagaram

West Godavari

Overall

MPTC elections

ZPTC elections

References

External links 

Four phase Grama Panchayati election schedule

Local elections in Andhra Pradesh
Local government in Andhra Pradesh
2020s in Andhra Pradesh
2021 elections in India